Enfield London Borough Council is the local authority for the London Borough of Enfield in Greater London, England. It is one of 32 London borough councils in the United Kingdom capital of London.

History

There have previously been a number of local authorities responsible for the Enfield area. The current local authority was first elected in 1964, a year before formally coming into its powers and prior to the creation of the London Borough of Enfield on 1 April 1965. Enfield replaced the Municipal Borough of Southgate, the Municipal Borough of Enfield and the Municipal Borough of Edmonton.

It was envisaged that through the London Government Act 1963 Enfield as a London local authority would share power with the Greater London Council. The split of powers and functions meant that the Greater London Council was responsible for "wide area" services such as fire, ambulance, flood prevention, and refuse disposal; with the local authorities responsible for "personal" services such as social care, libraries, cemeteries and refuse collection. As an outer London borough council it has been an education authority since 1965. This arrangement lasted until 1986 when Enfield London Borough Council gained responsibility for some services that had been provided by the Greater London Council, such as waste disposal. Since 2000 the Greater London Authority has taken some responsibility for highways and planning control from the council, but within the English local government system the council remains a "most purpose" authority in terms of the available range of powers and functions.

In 2014 Enfield was the subject of a series of articles in the Guardian about housing policies.

Powers and functions
The local authority derives its powers and functions from the London Government Act 1963 and subsequent legislation, and has the powers and functions of a London borough council. It sets council tax and as a billing authority also collects precepts for Greater London Authority functions and business rates. It sets planning policies which complement Greater London Authority and national policies, and decides on almost all planning applications accordingly.  It is a local education authority  and is also responsible for council housing, social services, libraries, waste collection and disposal, traffic, and most roads and environmental health.

See also
Enfield local elections

References

External links 
London Borough of Enfield website

Local authorities in London
London borough councils
Politics of the London Borough of Enfield
Leader and cabinet executives
Local education authorities in England
Billing authorities in England